The following highways are numbered 41A:

Canada
 Alberta Highway 41A
 Saskatchewan Highway 41A

United States
 County Road 41A (Pasco County, Florida)
 Nebraska Spur 41A
 Nevada State Route 41A (former)
 New York State Route 41A